The 1998 Pepsi 400 presented by DeVilbiss was the 21st stock car race of the 1998 NASCAR Winston Cup Series season and the 29th iteration of the event. The race was held on Sunday, August 16, 1998, in Brooklyn, Michigan, at Michigan International Speedway, a two-mile (3.2 km) moderate-banked D-shaped speedway. The race took the scheduled 200 laps to complete. Within the closing laps of the race, Hendrick Motorsports driver Jeff Gordon was able to take the lead with ten to go to take his 37th career NASCAR Winston Cup Series victory, his eighth of the season, and his fourth consecutive victory up to that point. To fill out the podium, Joe Gibbs Racing driver Bobby Labonte and Robert Yates Racing driver Dale Jarrett would finish second and third, respectively.

Background 

The race was held at Michigan International Speedway, a two-mile (3.2 km) moderate-banked D-shaped speedway located in Brooklyn, Michigan. The track is used primarily for NASCAR events. It is known as a "sister track" to Texas World Speedway as MIS's oval design was a direct basis of TWS, with moderate modifications to the banking in the corners, and was used as the basis of Auto Club Speedway. The track is owned by International Speedway Corporation. Michigan International Speedway is recognized as one of motorsports' premier facilities because of its wide racing surface and high banking (by open-wheel standards; the 18-degree banking is modest by stock car standards).

Entry list 

 (R) denotes rookie driver.

*Driver changed to Frank Kimmel after suffering a concussion at the 1998 Brickyard 400.

Practice

First practice 
The first practice session was held on Friday, August 14.

Final practice 
The final practice session, sometimes referred to as Happy Hour, was held on Saturday, August 15.

Qualifying 
Qualifying was split into two rounds. The first round was held on Friday, August 14, at 3:00 PM EST. Each driver would have one lap to set a time. During the first round, the top 25 drivers in the round would be guaranteed a starting spot in the race. If a driver was not able to guarantee a spot in the first round, they had the option to scrub their time from the first round and try and run a faster lap time in a second round qualifying run, held on Saturday, August 15, at 10:45 AM EST. As with the first round, each driver would have one lap to set a time. On January 24, 1998, NASCAR would announce that the amount of provisionals given would be increased from last season. Positions 26-36 would be decided on time, while positions 37-43 would be based on provisionals. Six spots are awarded by the use of provisionals based on owner's points. The seventh is awarded to a past champion who has not otherwise qualified for the race. If no past champion needs the provisional, the next team in the owner points will be awarded a provisional.

Four drivers would fail to qualify: Dave Marcis, Kenny Wallace, Gary Bradberry, and Hut Stricklin.

Full qualifying results

Race results

References 

1998 NASCAR Winston Cup Series
NASCAR races at Michigan International Speedway
August 1998 sports events in the United States
1998 in sports in Michigan